Richard Jacob is a sports coach.

Richard Jacob may also refer to:

Richard Taylor Jacob, American politician and attorney

See also
Richard Jacobs (disambiguation)